Gilbert Andersen (sometimes misspelled Anderson) (27 November 1879 – 20 September 1930) was a Norwegian-American racecar driver active during the formative years of auto racing.

Biography
Gilbert "Gil" Andersen was born on 27 November 1879 in Horten, Vestfold county, Norway. He later became a citizen of the United States. He married Elsie Olsen on 3 March 1909 in Minneapolis, Hennepin, Minnesota  He competed in the first six Indianapolis 500 races, appearing in annual races  from 1911 through 1916. For the 1911 Indianapolis 500, all of the drivers except for Gil Andersen were American citizens. One of his major victories was in the 1913 Elgin Road Race, which he won at an average speed of 71 mph. On October 9, 1915, Andersen set a new auto speed record of 102.6 mph, winning the first Astor Cup race at Sheepshead Bay. N.Y. In 1928 Andersen established a new American stock car speed record, when he clocked 106.52 mph in a Stutz Blackhawk on the measured mile at Daytona Beach, Florida.

He worked as an engineer for the Stutz Motor Company. Stutz was in operation from 1911 and continued through 1935.  Gil Andersen also was an engineer for the ReVere Motor Company. ReVere Motor Company was located in Logansport, Cass County, Indiana is a defunct luxury car manufacturing company which was in operation from 1918 until 1926.

Gil Andersen died of pulmonary tuberculosis on September 20, 1930 in Logansport, Indiana at age 51.

Indy 500 results

Images

References

External links
 
 The ReVere Motor Company
 Stutz Club

1879 births
1935 deaths
People from Horten
Norwegian racing drivers
Norwegian emigrants to the United States
American racing drivers
Indianapolis 500 drivers
Indianapolis 500 polesitters
Sportspeople from Vestfold og Telemark